David L. Etherly (born December 22, 1962) was a former American football cornerback in the National Football League (NFL) for the Washington Redskins.  He played college football at Oregon State University and Portland State University.

Professional career
Etherly played for the Washington Redskins in 1987 season.  The 1987 season began with a 24-day players' strike, reducing the 16-game season to 15.  The games for weeks 4–6 were won with all replacement players, including Etherly. The Redskins have the distinction of being the only team with no players crossing the picket line.  Those three victories are often credited with getting the team into the playoffs and the basis for the 2000 movie The Replacements.

References

External links
 

1962 births
Living people
Washington Redskins players
American football cornerbacks
Oregon State Beavers football players
Portland State Vikings football players
National Football League replacement players